Pajajaran Stadium is a multi-use stadium in Bogor, Indonesia.  It is currently used mostly for football matches and is used as the home venue for PSB Bogor.  The stadium holds 12,000 people.
In the area around the stadium, there are some areas for sports such as tennis, indoor and outdoor basketball, softball field and the Bogor Public Library..

References

Sports venues in West Java
Football venues in West Java
Multi-purpose stadiums in West Java
Buildings and structures in West Java
Southeast Asian Games football venues